Ruben Amar (born in 1974) is a French screenwriter, director and producer. He is best known for the independent feature film Swim Little Fish Swim and his two last short films Checkpoint and A Girl Like You With a Boy Like Me.

Career

Early career and short films 

Amar attended business school and spent time working for startups and television production companies, then decided to pursue cinema and attended filmmaking workshops in London.

Between 2007 and 2011, he directed several short films, shot in Paris, London, New York and on the Israeli-Palestinian border. These films appeared in many international festivals including Clermont-Ferrand International Short Film Festival, International Film Festival Rotterdam, and South by Southwest (SXSW).

Checkpoint, one of his last short film has premiered at Clermont-Ferrand International Short Film Festival in 2011 where it won the Youth Critic Award. The film tells the story of a young Palestinian boy living in the Gaza Strip who accompanies his father on monthly visits to the ruins of a destroyed village. Checkpoint was exhibited worldwide in international film festivals including Clermont-Ferrand International Short Film Festival, Slamdance, Palm Springs International Film Festival, Raindance, and Festival du cinéma méditerranéen de Montpellier. Checkpoint was broadcast by international TV channels (TPS, BeTV, Canal+ Poland, RTBF). Reviewers praised the film's story and cinematography.

Feature films 

A year later, following the success of Checkpoint, Ruben Amar started co-writing, co-directing and co-producing with Lola Bessis their first feature film, Swim Little Fish Swim (2013).

Ruben Amar also produced Nathan Silvers feature film, Thirst Street (2017) with his new production company PaperMoon Films.

Filmography

Feature films 
 Swim Little Fish Swim (2014) - Writer, Director & Producer
 Thirst Street (2017) - Producer

Short films 
 Objet perdu(e) (2007) - Writer, Director & Producer
 Des Mots Silencieux (2007) - Writer, Director & Producer
 L'Absente (2008) - Writer, Director & Producer
 Mauvaise Route (2008) - Writer & Producer
 A Girl Like You With a Boy Like Me (2010) - Writer, Director & Producer
 Checkpoint (2011) - Writer, Director & Producer
 Don't Let the Sun Blast Your Shadow (2011) - Writer, Director & Producer

References

External links 
 
 Ruben Amar at AlloCiné (French)
 Official Website

Film directors from Paris
French male screenwriters
French screenwriters
French film producers
Living people
1974 births
Mass media people from Montpellier